Lord Gyllene (10 November 1988 – 12 December 2016) was a New Zealand-bred racehorse whose greatest victory came in the 1997 Grand National at Aintree. He was trained by Steve Brookshaw for owner Sir Stanley Clarke CBE and ridden by Tony Dobbin. Lord Gyllene was retired by his owner in 2001 due to injury. He had a race record in the UK of 13 runs: won 4, second 5 and third once, as well as two wins from 23 starts in New Zealand.  His final appearance in his homeland was a winning one, in a steeplechase at Te Rapa racecourse in Hamilton on 16 September 1995.  That followed his second at Ellerslie to one of the great jumpers in New Zealand racing history, Sydney Jones, in the Pakuranga Hunt Cup, one of New Zealand's most prestigious jumping races.

The victory of Lord Gyllene is remembered as much for the circumstances surrounding the bomb threats and re-staging of the Grand National on the following Monday, as for his winning the event.

Lord Gyllene died at the age of 28 on 12 December 2016.

References

External links
http://news.bbc.co.uk/sport1/hi/other_sports/horse_racing/7240745.stm
http://www.racingpost.co.uk/horses/racing_horse_form.sd?horse_id=108595
http://news.bbc.co.uk/sport1/hi/northern_ireland/1216453.stm
http://www.bbc.co.uk/liverpool/content/articles/2006/12/01/local_history_aintree_1997_feature.shtml

1988 racehorse births
2016 racehorse deaths
Thoroughbred family 1-j
Racehorses bred in New Zealand
Racehorses trained in New Zealand
Racehorses trained in the United Kingdom
Grand National winners